Patrice Buzzanell is a distinguished professor at the Brian Lamb School of Communication at Purdue University.  She focuses on organizational communication from a feminist viewpoint.  A majority of the research Dr. Buzzanell has completed is geared towards how everyday interactions, identities, and social structures can be affected by the intersections of gender.  She researches how these dynamics can impact overall practices, decisions, and results in the workplace, and more specifically, in the STEM fieldwork environments.

Dr. Buzzanell has written four books and 85 book chapters, published over 80 journal articles, as well as contributed numerous conference papers.  She is also a highly involved professor at Purdue University, where she is affiliated faculty with both Women's, Gender, and Sexuality Studies and the Center for Families, serves as a faculty team advisor, and maintains a courtesy appointment with the School of Engineering Education.  She also serves as the Butler Chair and Director of the Susan Bulkeley Butler Center for Leadership Excellence.

Life and Education 
Dr. Buzzanell attended Towson University to earn her B.S. where she graduated summa cum laude; she attended Ohio University to earn her M.A., and finally, she attended Purdue University to earn her Ph.D. in organizational communication.  She worked as an Associate Professor for five years at Northern Illinois University, but she has been teaching in the Brian Lamb School of Communication at Purdue University for the past eighteen years.  She resides in Lafayette, Indiana Area.

Scholarly work 
Dr. Buzzanell began publishing in 1991, covering topics such as feminist organizational communication theory, reframing the glass ceiling as a socially constructed process, and researching leadership processes in alternative organizations.  She then released her first edited book in 2000, which was titled Rethinking Organizational and Managerial Communication from Feminist Perspectives. She has since been a featured author of chapters in different books and has written several articles (67 refereed, 17 non-refereed).

Other contributions 
Patrice Buzzanell continues to stay active in her research agenda, as well as contribute to the field in other ways.  Dr. Buzzanell is on the International Academic Committee, which is an advisory board for the Global Communication Research Institute.  She is a part of the National Communication Association on both the NCA Publications Board and the NCA Task Force on Inclusivity and is a Council of Communication Associations ICA representative as well.  She also currently serves as a board member for eight different journals.  Previously, she has been involved as president of the International Communication Association, the Council of Communication Associations, and the Organization for the Study of Communication, Language and Gender.

Awards 
Dr. Buzzanell has received awards for top papers, articles, and books, has been presented with numerous awards for mentoring/teaching as well as research and scholarship honors, and has been recognized for her engagement in different service organizations.  She has been awarded over 75 times throughout her career, including the 2014 Provost’s Outstanding Graduate Mentor Award, and the Teresa Award in 2012 for the feminist viewpoint she incorporated into organizational communication.  Some other awards/honors Dr. Buzzanell has received are:

-University Distinguished Professor at Purdue University from 2015 to present

-B. Aubrey Fisher Mentorship Award in 2016

-Top Panel Award in 2016 for “Reframing, Rejecting, and Repurposing Work/Life Boundaries through Communication”

-Helen B. Schleman Gold Medallion in 2010

-Outstanding Scholarly Article in 2006 for her article "Struggling with Maternity Leave Policies and Practices: A Poststructuralist Feminist Analysis of Gendered Organizing

-Charles H. Woolbert Research Award in 2006

-Violet Haas Award in 2003

-Outstanding Young Women in America in 1982

Dr. Buzzanell also has a number of distinguished lectures and keynote addresses at different universities across both the country and the world.

Bibliography

Books 
Cases in Organizational and Managerial Communication: Stretching Boundaries 

Distinctive qualities in communication research 

Gender in Applied Communication Contexts 

Rethinking Organization and Managerial Communication from Feminist Perspectives

Book chapters 
Public Understandings of Women in STEM: A Prototype Analysis of Governmental Discourse from the C-SPAN Archives 

How Resilience is Constructed in Everyday Work-life Experience Across the Lifespan 

Revisiting Sexual Harassment in Academe:  Using Feminist Ethical and Sensemaking Approaches to Analyze Macrodiscourses and Micropractices of Sexual Harassment 

Having—and doing—it all? The Hidden Nature of Informal Support Systems in Career and Personal Life Management

Journal articles 
Stories of Caregiving: Intersections of Academic Research and Women’s Everyday Experiences 

Negotiating Maternity Leave Expectations:  Perceived Tensions Between Ethics of Justice and Care 

An Organizational Communication Challenge to the Discourse of Work and Family Research: From Problematics to Empowerment 

Gendered Practices in the Contemporary Workplace:  A Critique of What Often Constitutes Front Page New in the Wall Street Journal

See also 
 Intersectionality
 Organizational communication

References 

Year of birth missing (living people)
Living people
Northern Illinois University faculty
Ohio University alumni
Purdue University alumni
Purdue University faculty
Towson University alumni